Sovetsky is a rural locality (a settlement) and the administrative center of Sovetskoye Rural Settlement, Oktyabrsky District, Volgograd Oblast, Russia. The population was 280 as of 2010. There are 12 streets.

Geography 
The village is located in steppe, on Yergeni, 21 km northwest of Oktyabrsky.

References 

Rural localities in Oktyabrsky District, Volgograd Oblast